Women Industrial Training Institute, Kolkata,  is women's government vocational training institute located in Gariahat Road Kolkata,  West Bengal. This ITI was established in the Year 1992 under the World Bank Scheme by the Directorate of Industrial Training, Govt. of West Bengal, with a view to Women Empowerment Programme, enabling Women to become self-sufficient so that they may not only influence their family income but the national economy also by acquiring different industrial skills. This ITI offers different training courses on Craftsman, Secretarial Practice, Cosmetology etc.

External links
https://www.womenitikol.org.in

References

Educational institutions established in 1992
1992 establishments in West Bengal
Industrial Training Institute (ITI) in West Bengal